Sheik Faoud Ahamul Fasiel Bacchus (born  31 January 1954) is a former cricketer who played for the West Indies and the United States.

Early career 
A right-handed batsman, he made his Test match debut for the West Indies aged 24 in the 1977/78 series against Australia. His best series was in 1978/79 against India, where he scored 96 in the second Test and 250 in the sixth Test, although overall he averaged 26.06 in his 19 Test matches and was dropped from the side after the 1981/82 tour of Australia.

He also played 29 One Day Internationals for the West Indies between 1977 and 1983, with a high score of 80 and an average of 26.60, winning two man of the match awards.

Bacchus' West Indies came to an end after he joined the rebel tour to South Africa in 1983–84, defying the international sporting boycott of the apartheid state.

US career 
After migrating to the US, he continued playing at a professional level, captaining the United States in the 1997 and 2001 ICC Trophy tournaments.

At the 2002 ICC Americas Championship in Buenos Aires, the United States Cricket Team won its first international championship. Bacchus, captain, was named "Man of the Match" for making the highest individual score with 83 runs.

He joined the West Indies Over-50s World Cup squad to compete in South Africa against 11 other nations in 2020.

Bacchus also coached for the US team.

References

External links

1954 births
Living people
American cricket captains
American cricket coaches
Border cricketers
Coaches of the United States national cricket team
Cricketers at the 1983 Cricket World Cup
Demerara cricketers
Guyana cricketers
Guyanese cricket coaches
Guyanese emigrants to the United States
Indo-Guyanese people
Sportspeople from Georgetown, Guyana
West Indies One Day International cricketers
West Indies Test cricketers
Western Province cricketers